The Battle of Manila was fought during the Seven Years' War, from 24 September 1762 to 6 October 1762, between the Kingdom of Great Britain and the Kingdom of Spain in and around Manila, the capital of the Philippines, a Spanish colony at that time.  The British won, leading to a twenty-month occupation of Manila.

Prelude
(of 74 guns) served as the vice-admiral's flagship. They carried a force of 6,839 regulars, sailors and marines. The commander of the land forces of the expedition was Brigadier-General William Draper. He was assisted by Colonel Monson as second in command, Major Scott as adjutant-general and Captain Fletcher as brigade-major of the East India Company. The expeditionary force consisted of the 79th Draper's Regiment of Foot, a company of Royal Artillery, 29 East India Company artillerymen, 610 sepoys, and 365 irregulars.

Manila was garrisoned by the Life Guard of the Governor-General of the Philippines, the 2nd Battalion of the King's regiment under Don Miguel de Valdez, Spanish marines, a corps of artillery under Lt. Gen. Don Felix de Eguilux, seconded by Brig. the Marquis de Villa Medina, a company of Pampangos, and a company of cadets.

Battle
Vice-Admiral Cornish's fleet, twelve vessels, of which eight carried more than fifty guns apiece, anchored in Manila Bay on 23 September. A landing was planned two miles south of the city, covered by the three frigates , under Captain Richard King, under Captain Charles Cathcart Grant, and  under Captain John Pelghin. The three-pronged landing force of 274 marines was led by Colonel Draper, center, Major More, right, and Colonel Monson, left. The next day, they were joined by 632 seamen under Captains Collins, Pitchford and Ouvry.

Fort Polverina was captured on 25 September. Further reconnaissance revealed that the fortifications of Manila were not formidable, in fact they were incomplete. "In many places the ditch had never been finished, the covered way was out of repair, the glacis was too low, some of the outworks were without cannon..."

On 30 September, a British storeship arrived with entrenching tools, but was driven ashore by a gale. She had run aground so that she screened the rear of Draper's camp from a large force of Filipinos. Her stores were landed with greater speed and safety than would have been possible had she remained afloat for the gale continued for several days and forbade the passage of boats through the surf.

A strong gale started on 1 October, cutting off communication with the British fleet. On the morning of 4 October, a force of 1,000 local Pampangos attacked a recently built cantonment but was beaten back with 300 casualties. After this failure, all except 1,800 of the Pamgangos abandoned the city. "The fire from the garrison now became faint, while that of the besiegers was stronger than ever, and ere long a breach became practicable."  On 6 October, 60 volunteers under Lieutenant Russell advanced through the breach in the Bastion of St. Andrew.  Engineers and pioneers followed, then came Colonel Monson and Major More with two divisions of the 79th, the seamen and then another division of the 79th.

Preventing further casualties on both sides (in accordance with his Catholic beliefs), acting Governor-General Archbishop Manuel Rojo del Rio y Vieyra surrendered both Manila and Cavite to Draper and Cornish.

Aftermath

The British occupation of Manila lasted until Manila was returned to Spain according to the 1763 Treaty of Paris. News that it had been lost did not reach Spain until after the cessation of hostilities between the two powers. Oidor Don Simon Anda y Salazar had been dispatched to Bulacan in order to organize Spanish resistance. There he organized an army of 10,000 Filipinos under the command of Jose Busto in Pinagbakahan, City of Malolos

Manila was placed under the authority of civilian Deputy Governor Dawsonne Drake, appointed by the East India Company as the leader of the Manila Council.  Major Fell commanded the garrison as another member of the council

During their time in the Philippines, the British found themselves confined to Manila and Cavite in a deteriorating situation, unable to extend British control over the islands and unable to make good their promised support for an uprising led first by Diego Silang and later by his wife Gabriela, which was crushed by Spanish forces.

The British expedition was rewarded after the capture of the treasure ship Filipina, carrying American silver from Acapulco, and in a battle off Cavite on October 2, 1762 the Spanish ship Santísima Trinidad which carried goods from China bound for Spain. The capture of the ship made both men wealthy, and to such an extent that they were able to retire back home on the prize money alone.

The city remained under British rule for 18 months and was returned to Spain in April 1764 after the 1763 Treaty of Paris.

Draper and Cornish were thanked by Parliament on 19 April 1763; Cornish was made a Baronet of Great Britain, and Draper eventually received as Knighthood of the Bath.

See also

 List of India-related topics in the Philippines
 Military history of the Philippines

References

Bibliography
This article was originally based on material from 1762 – British expedition against Manila, which is licensed under the GFDL.
 Fortescue, J. W., A History of the British Army Vol. II, MacMillan, London, 1899, pp. 544–545.
 Rojo, Journal
 The Philippine Islands
 The New York Times
 British expedition against Manila

British invasion of Manila
History of Manila
Manila
1762 in the Philippines
1762 in the Spanish East Indies
1762 in the British Empire
Manila 1762
History of the Philippines (1565–1898)
Manila 1762
Manila 1762
Manila 1762
Manila 1762
Manila 1762
Manila 1762
Manila 1762
Manila 1762
Manila 1762
Anglo-Spanish War (1762–1763)